The 2018 Copa do Nordeste was the 15th edition of the main football tournament featuring teams from the Brazilian Northeast Region. The competition featured 20 clubs, with Bahia and Pernambuco having three seeds each, and Ceará, Rio Grande do Norte, Sergipe, Alagoas, Paraíba, Maranhão and Piauí with two seeds each.

Sampaio Corrêa defeated the defending champions Bahia 1–0 on aggregate to win their first Copa do Nordeste title. As champions, Sampaio Corrêa qualified for the Round of 16 of the 2019 Copa do Brasil.

Format changes
In 2018 season there was a qualifying stage. In the qualifying stage, a total of 8 teams competed in a single-elimination tournament where the four winners advanced to the group stage. The group stage had only 4 groups. 12 teams gained direct entries into the group stage while the other four berths were decided by the qualifying stage.

Teams
The entry stage was determined as follows:
Group stage: 12 teams
Teams which qualified for berths 1–2 from Bahia, Ceará and Pernambuco
Teams which qualified for berth 1 from Alagoas, Maranhão, Paraíba, Piauí, Rio Grande do Norte and Sergipe
Qualifying stage: 8 teams
Teams which qualified for berth 3 from Bahia and Pernambuco
Teams which qualified for berth 2 from Alagoas, Maranhão, Paraíba, Piauí, Rio Grande do Norte and Sergipe

Schedule
The schedule of the competition was as follows.

Draws
The draw for the qualifying stage was held on 3 July 2017, 11:00, at the CBF headquarters in Rio de Janeiro.

Teams were seeded by their 2017 CBF ranking (shown in parentheses). The eight teams were drawn into four ties, with the Pot A teams hosting the second leg.

The draw for the group stage was held on 6 September 2017, 21:00, at the Auditório da Federação das Indústrias do Estado do Maranhão (FIEMA) in São Luís.

For the group stage, the 16 teams were drawn into four groups (Groups 1–4) of four containing a team from each of the four pots. Teams were seeded by their 2017 CBF ranking (shown in parentheses) excluding the winners of the qualifying stage, which were allocated to Pot 4.

Qualifying stage
In the qualifying stage, each tie was played on a home-and-away two-legged basis. If tied on aggregate, the away goals rule would be used. If still tied, extra time would not be played, and the penalty shoot-out would be used to determine the winner (Regulations Article 12).

Matches

|}

Group stage
In the group stage, each group was played on a home-and-away round-robin basis. The teams were ranked according to points (3 points for a win, 1 point for a draw, and 0 points for a loss). If tied on points, the following criteria would be used to determine the ranking: 1. Wins; 2. Goal difference; 3. Goals scored; 4. Head-to-head (if the tie was only between two teams).  If tie on aggregate, the away goals rule would be used (except if both teams shared the same stadium); 5. Fewest red cards; 6. Fewest yellow cards; 7. Draw in the headquarters of the Brazilian Football Confederation (Regulations Article 10).

The winners and runners-up of each group advanced to the quarter-finals of the knockout stages.

Group A

Group B

Group C

Group D

Final stages
Starting from the quarter-finals, the teams played a single-elimination tournament with the following rules:
Each tie would be played on a home-and-away two-legged basis, with the higher-seeded team hosting the second leg (Regulations Article 14.a and 15).
If tied on aggregate, the away goals rule would be used (except if both teams shared the same stadium). If still tied, extra time would not be played, and the penalty shoot-out would be used to determine the winner (Regulations Article 12).

Seeding
The draw for the quarter-finals was held on 2 April 2018, 12:00, at the CBF headquarters in Rio de Janeiro. The 8 qualified teams were drawn into four ties between a group winner (Pot 1) and a group runner-up (Pot 2), with the group winners hosting the second leg.

Starting from the semi-finals, the teams would be seeded according to their performance in the tournament. The teams would be ranked according to overall points. If tied on overall points, the following criteria would be used to determine the ranking: 1. Overall wins; 2. Overall goal difference; 3. Draw in the headquarters of the Brazilian Football Confederation (Regulations Article 15).

Bracket

Quarter-finals

|}

ABC won 5–1 on aggregate and advanced to the semi-finals.

Sampaio Corrêa won 3–0 on aggregate and advanced to the semi-finals.

Tied 3–3 on aggregate, Ceará won on away goals and advanced to the semi-finals.

Bahia won 2–1 on aggregate and advanced to the semi-finals.

Semi-finals

|}

Sampaio Corrêa won 2–1 on aggregate and advanced to the finals.

Bahia won 1–0 on aggregate and advanced to the finals.

Finals

|}

Top goalscorers

2018 Copa do Nordeste team
The 2018 Copa do Nordeste team was a squad consisting of the eleven most impressive players at the tournament.

||

References

2018 domestic association football cups
Copa do Nordeste
2018 in Brazilian football